Mezmay is a settlement in Apsheronsky District of Krasnodar Krai, Russia, located in the valley of the Kurdzhips River near its confluence with the Mezmay River,  south-east of Apsheronsk. Population: less than a thousand inhabitants. It is a popular mountain resort.

The village was linked with Apsheronsk by branch line of the Apsheronsk narrow-gauge railway, yet, in 2010 this branch was almost completely dismantled, except  length part between Mezmay and village Guamka. This remaining railway was from 2011 to 2017 interrupted due to a landslide.

Name
The name Mezmay is formed of the two Circassian words Mez (forest) and Mye (wild apple), so Mezmay translated from Circassian as "wild apples forest."

Landmarks
Mezmay is a popular tourist site with a lot of natural attractions: (waterfalls, caves, canyons, etc.), the Clay Roman necropolis (Mezmayskoe burial) on the north-western outskirts of the village and the astrophysics observatory of the Kuban State University.

There is also Mezmaiskaya cave, where, in 1993, was found perfectly preserved skeleton of a Neanderthal baby from which DNA  was extracted.

References

External links
Tourism in Mezmay 

Rural localities in Krasnodar Krai